800 Words (stylised as 800 words) is a comedy-drama television series, co-produced by South Pacific Pictures and Seven Productions for the Seven Network.

Premise 
George Turner is a popular columnist for a top-selling Sydney newspaper, writing a weekly column which he insists must be exactly 800 words. After his wife dies, he buys (over the internet and unseen) a new home in a (fictional) small New Zealand seaside town called Weld, where his parents took him on holiday as a child. He then has to break the news to his two teenage children, Shay and Arlo. But the colourful and inquisitive locals in Weld ensure Turner's dream of a fresh start does not go exactly to plan.

Cast

Main 
 Erik Thomson as George Turner
 Melina Vidler as Shay Turner
 Benson Jack Anthony as Arlo Turner
 Rick Donald as Jeff "Woody" Woodson, an Australian expat builder who moved to Weld for the surf
 Bridie Carter as Jan, George's former boss and editor in Sydney
 Emma Leonard as Tracey Dennis, an Australian expat and Shay and Arlo's form teacher at Weld High School
 Michelle Langstone as Fiona, the owner-operator of the Weld Boat Club and a volunteer ambulance driver
 Anna Jullienne as Katie Bell, a part-Maori artist and owner of the Weld arts and crafts gallery
 Cian Elyse White as Hannah, a surfer who works part-time at the Weld Boat Club and the local surf shop

Recurring 
 Jonathan Brugh as Monty McNamara, a real estate agent who sold George his new home in Weld and is a volunteer firefighter
 Peter Elliott as Bill "Big Mac" McNamara, the financial king-pin of Weld and father to Bill Jr, Monty and Robbie
 Paul Glover as Bill McNamara Jr, father to Lindsay and Jared
 Manon Blackman as Lindsay McNamara, Bill Jr's daughter.
 Matt Holden as Jared McNamara, Bill Jr's son
 Olivia Tennet as Siouxsie McNamara, Monty's daughter and secretary
 John Leigh as Constable Tom, Weld's local police officer and photographer
 Alex Tarrant as Ike, one of Zac's children and love interest of Shay
 Reon Bell as Billy, Katie and Zac's son
 Rob Kipa-Williams as Zac, Katie's ex-partner and father to Ike, Hannah, and Billy
 Renee Lyons as Brenda, runs the supermarket
 Jesse Griffin as Sean, works for the local council
 Henry Beasley as Ollie, works at the petrol station, has a crush on Shay
 David Fane as Smiler.
 Tandi Wright as Laura Turner (flashbacks), deceased wife of George and mother to Shay and Arlo
 Elizabeth Hawthorne as Trish, Laura's mother
 Peter Hayden as Roger, Laura's father
 Jackie van Beek as Gloria (season 2), production manager of the local newspaper, News of the Weld
 Millen Baird as Robert "Robbie" McNamara (season 2), Fiona's ex
 Ditch Davey as Terry Turner (season 2), George's younger brother who is a chef
 Jamaica Vaughan as Emma (season 2), Fiona's niece and summer love interest of Arlo
 Jessica Redmayne as Poppy (season 3), Woody's 16-year-old daughter
 Rachael Carpani as Mary (season 3), Woody's ex and mother to Poppy
 Miriama Smith as Ngahuia (season 3), Zac's ex and mother to Ike

Production 
The series was first announced on 29 October 2014 with the Channel Seven 2015 highlights. The CEO of South Pacific Pictures, Kelly Martin said "Seven loved the scripts from the start and we're thrilled to have this project underway. It enables South Pacific Pictures to broaden our horizons and it'll open up some great opportunities for our local actors and crew." Of the series' tone, the Program Chief of Seven, Tim Ross stated, "If you think this show has a bit of the same feel and vibe as Packed to the Rafters, you're dead right—and we make no apologies for that." Filming for the series began on 2 March 2015.

On 19 October 2015, the Seven Network and South Pacific Pictures renewed the show for a second season. It premiered on 23 August 2016 in Australia. On 24 January 2017, the Seven Network announced that the series had been renewed for a third season. It screened from 12 September 2017 with a mid-season finale after eight episodes.

On 17 August 2018 Seven Network cancelled the series after three seasons.

Episodes

Series overview

Season 1 (2015)

Season 2 (2016–2017)

Season 3 (2017–2018)

Release

Broadcast 
The series premiered in Australia on 15 September 2015 on the Seven Network and premiered in New Zealand on 5 November 2015 on TVNZ 1. In the United States, the series premiered on Acorn TV in 2016 and PBS in March 2017. UPtv acquired the series and will air it later this year. The series premiered in Finland on YLE TV1 in June 2017. In the UK, the first two series were broadcast on BBC One in April/May 2018. The third series was shown in the UK on BBC One in July/August 2019.

Home media 
Season one along with part one and two of season two are available on iTunes in Australia.

Compilations

Ratings

Season 1

Season 2

Season 3

Remake  
On 8 January 2018, Zomer in Zeeland (translated: Summer in Zeeland) premiered on the Dutch channel SBS6. The show stars Daniël Boissevain as Sjors Mulder, Pip Pellens as his daughter Fenna Mulder and Tonko Bossen as his son Jurgen Mulder. The remake follows the same storyline, but changes the setting to the Dutch province of Zeeland, after which the country of New Zealand was named.

References

External links 
 
 
 800 Words at South Pacific Pictures
 

2010s New Zealand television series
2015 Australian television series debuts
2018 Australian television series endings
2015 New Zealand television series debuts
2018 New Zealand television series endings
Australian comedy-drama television series
English-language television shows
New Zealand comedy-drama television series
Seven Network original programming
Television shows set in New Zealand
TVNZ 1 original programming
Television series by Seven Productions
Television series by South Pacific Pictures
Television series by All3Media
Television shows filmed in New Zealand